Erdut is a village and a municipality in eastern Croatia some 37 km east of the major city of Osijek. Lying on the border with neighbouring Serbia, it was the site of the signing of the Erdut Agreement, which initiated the UNTAES transitional administration over the Eastern Slavonia, Baranja and Western Syrmia.

The village of Erdut is the third largest in the municipality, after Dalj and Bijelo Brdo. The municipality is part of the Osijek-Baranja County in eastern Slavonia. The municipal center is in the largest village of Dalj.

Name and languages 

The name Erdut comes from the local Hungarian name (Erdőd) meaning "forest road". In other languages, the village in German is known as Erdung and in Serbian as Ердут.

Due to the local minority population, the Erdut municipality prescribe the use of not only Croatian as the official language, but the Serbian language and Serbian Cyrillic alphabet as well.

Geography
The municipality has a total area of 158 km2 (61 sq mi) and is the largest member municipality of Joint Council of Municipalities. The Drava (5.6 km) and Danube (34.825 km) rivers flow through the municipality. The territory of the municipality is completely flat very fertile black soil. The elevation of the village of Erdut is 158 m. It is located at the end of the D213 road near border crossing with Serbia. The railway station is located in Novi Erdut (New Erdut) hamlet, about 1 km south of the village, on the Vukovar-Erdut-Bogojevo (Serbia) railway.

History

The settlement was first mentioned in 1335 under the Hungarian name Erdöd and then as a city in 1472. It was successively ruled by Ottoman Empire, Austrian Empire, Austria-Hungary, Kingdom of Yugoslavia, Independent State of Croatia and Yugoslavia.

Croatian War of Independence

When Croatia declared independence from Yugoslavia in 1991, eastern Slavonia was soon overrun by the Yugoslav People's Army and Serb paramilitaries, led by the notorious warlord, Željko Ražnatović known by the name Arkan. The battle for Erdut quickly ended that summer as the entire Croatian population was expelled or killed along with other minorities including Czechs, Germans, Hungarians, Ruthenians and Ukrainians in an act of ethnic cleansing. Their homes were soon occupied by other Serbs. Many buildings and homes were destroyed, including the Roman Catholic Church.

Arkan soon set up a training camp for his Serb Volunteer Guard in Erdut, which became headquarters until the end of the war, when Croatian forces returned according to a peaceful Basic Agreement on the Region of Eastern Slavonia, Baranja and Western Sirmium.

Erdut Agreement

On November 12, 1995, officials signed what is commonly called the Erdut Agreement in which the part of eastern Slavonia still occupied by Serbs would be integrated back into Croatia, gradually allowing some of the exiled refugees to return to their homes. This agreement was the basis for the establishment of Joint Council of Municipalities. Erdut has been under Croatian control since 1998.

Demographics

Population
According to the 2011 census, the municipality has a population is 7,308. The municipal population consists of Serbs (55,56%), Croats (37,96%) and Hungarians (5,06%).

There are 4 settlements in municipality:

Religion
Dalj is seat of the Eparchy of Osječko polje and Baranja of the Serbian Orthodox Church.

Politics

Joint Council of Municipalities
The Municipality of Erdut is one of seven Serb majority member municipalities within the Joint Council of Municipalities, inter-municipal sui generis organization of ethnic Serb community in eastern Croatia established on the basis of Erdut Agreement. As Serb community constitute majority of the population of the municipality it is represented by 2 delegated Councillors at the Assembly of the Joint Council of Municipalities, double the number of Councilors to the number from Serb minority municipalities in Eastern Croatia.

Municipality government
The municipality assembly is composed of 13 representatives. As of 2021, the member parties are:

Economy
Erdut development index is between 50 and 76% of the Croatian average, and is underdeveloped municipality which is statistically classified as the First Category Area of Special State Concern by the Government of Croatia.

Culture

Points of Interest

The municipality is home of Eparchy of Osječko polje and Baranja, and there is also Erdut Castle.

Notable natives and residents
 Milutin Milanković, born in Dalj
 Anton Tittjung, World War II concentration camp guard, who was stripped of his U.S. citizenship for his wartime activities.

See also
 Erdut Agreement
 Osijek-Baranja County
 Slavonia
 Joint Council of Municipalities
 Cultural and Scientific Center "Milutin Milanković"
 High School Dalj
 List of Croatian municipalities with minority languages in official use

References

External links
 
 

Municipalities of Croatia
Slavonia
Joint Council of Municipalities
Croatia–Serbia border crossings
Populated places on the Danube
Serb communities in Croatia